Lima City Schools or Lima City School District refers to a school district that serves students in Lima, Ohio and surrounding communities.

Schools
Elementary
 Freedom Elementary School
 Heritage Elementary School
 Independence Elementary School
 Liberty Elementary School
 Unity Elementary School

Middle Schools
 Lima North Middle School
 Lima South Middle School
 Lima West Middle School

High Schools
 Lima Senior High School
 Lima Alternative High School

External links
 Lima City Schools Official Website

School districts in Ohio
Lima, Ohio
Education in Allen County, Ohio